This is a list of institutional investors in the United Kingdom. Institutional investors manage other people's money by buying shares in companies, corporate bonds, gilts (i.e. government debt), commodities, foreign currencies, or combinations of each, or derivatives of them (i.e. options to buy, or futures). The main kinds of UK institutional investors are,

pension funds (where beneficiaries are saving for retirement)
insurance companies (where policyholders are insuring against risk, most importantly life insurance: effectively also a pension)
mutual funds (including investment companies, investment trusts, or unit trusts, where people are saving surplus wealth for any purpose)
sovereign wealth funds (government funds, often for saving wealth generated by natural resources)

Sovereign wealth funds are a recent addition, and grew following the Asian financial crisis from 1997, becoming important investors in the London Stock Exchange. Fund managers (usually known as investment advisers in the US), who typically belong to the same organisations as those running large mutual funds, play a critical role because normally the "primary" institutional investors delegate investment choices and corporate governance decisions to the fund manager. UK banks do not traditionally play an important role as institutional investors, as they do for instance in Germany.

The Institutional Investor Committee represents the interests of the NAPF, ABI, IMA, AITC and the British Merchant Banking and Securities House Association.

Mutual funds
Representing the mutual fund and fund management industry is primarily the Investment Management Association (established in 2002, merging the Institutional Fund Managers Association and the Association of Unit Trusts and Investment Funds). The Association of Investment Companies is also a representation body, with an overlapping membership, but includes only businesses dealing in closed end investment companies.

These are the largest fund managers according to billions of pounds of assets under management.

Pension funds
The Association of Member Nominated Trustees and the National Association of Pension Funds are the umbrella bodies representing the interests of pension funds collectively. The number of pension funds largely mirrors the number of companies, as pensions have often not merged on an industry-wide basis. Many pension funds for local councils fall within the umbrella group of the Local Government Pension Scheme, but as yet there is no consolidated management.

Insurance companies
The Association of British Insurers is the umbrella body for UK insurance companies.

See also
UK labour law and UK company law
List of unions, and in the UK, Germany and the US
List of largest United Kingdom employers
FTSE 100 and FT 30, S&P 100, HDAX and DAX
List of hedge funds
List of private equity firms

Notes

Institutional investors
Investment in the United Kingdom
Institutional investors